Tuatara – A Flying Nun Compilation is a compilation of previously released songs by artists on New Zealand based Flying Nun Records. It was released as a vinyl album by Flying Nun in 1985 (catalogue number FN045) and on CD with additional tracks. The Chills track was mistakenly attributed to "The Cills".

Track listing
"Fish" – The Clean (2:26)
"Coalminer's Song" – The Gordons (5:57)
"State to Be in" – Fetus Productions (2:40)
"Death And the Maiden" – The Verlaines (4:34)
"Looking For the Sun" – Children's Hour (6:06)
"Isol" – Marie and the Atom (5:32)
"Pink Frost" – The Chills (4:03)
"Throwing Stones" – Sneaky Feelings (4:40)
"Neck of the Woods" – The Great Unwashed (2:07)
"I Go Wild" – The Bats (2:44)
"Man With No Desire" – The Expendables (5:15)
"The Brain That Wouldn't Die" – Tall Dwarfs
 
Additional tracks on CD edition
"Circumspect Penelope" – Look Blue Go Purple (2:53)
"Since The Accident" – Scorched Earth Policy (3:21)
"Needles And Plastic" – Doublehappys (5:25)

References
 Flying Nun re-release announcement
 Promotional poster at National Library of New Zealand

Compilation albums by New Zealand artists
1985 compilation albums
Rock compilation albums
Flying Nun Records compilation albums